The 2022 Toronto mayoral election was held on October 24, 2022, to elect the mayor of Toronto. The election took place alongside the 2022 Toronto municipal election, which elected city councillors and school board trustees. John Tory was re-elected for a third term as mayor, defeating urbanist Gil Peñalosa and 29 other candidates.

Tory was first elected as Mayor of Toronto in the 2014 election and was re-elected in 2018. He launched his third re-election bid on May 2, 2022. A total of 31 candidates were nominated.

Mayoral debates 
Several mayoral debates took place during the campaign.  

Incumbent John Tory took part in two debates. The first took place on 13 October (a debate staged by CARP and Zoomer Radio), featuring Tory, Gil Penalosa, Chloe-Marie Brown, Sarah Climenhaga and Jack Yan. A second took place on October 17, staged by the Toronto Board of Trade. Five candidates were invited: Brown, Climenhaga, Penalosa, Stephen Punwasi and Tory. 

Other debates have took place, albeit without John Tory participating. Some criticized the lack of debates, noting that previous mayoral elections featured as many as 10 mayoral debates across the city.

Candidates 
Registration for candidates for the office of mayor officially opened on Monday, May 2, 2022. The deadline for candidate nominations closed Friday, August 19 at 2 p.m. 31 candidates were nominated.

Declined 
 Mike Layton, Councillor for Ward 11 University—Rosedale.
 Joe Cressy, Councillor for Ward 10 Spadina—Fort York (2014–2022).
 Faith Goldy, third-place finisher in 2018 mayoral election.

Polls

Results
Unofficial results are taken from the City of Toronto website.

References 

Mayoral elections in Toronto
2022 in Toronto
Toronto